Antigua and Barbuda is a twin-island country in the Americas, lying between the Caribbean Sea and the Atlantic Ocean. It consists of two major inhabited islands, Antigua and Barbuda, and a number of smaller islands (including Great Bird, Green, Guinea, Long, Maiden and York Islands and further south, the island of Redonda). The permanent population numbers about 81,800 (at the 2011 Census) and the capital and largest port and city is St. John's, on Antigua.

Tourism dominates the economy, accounting for more than half of the Gross Domestic Product (GDP). Antigua is famous for its many luxury resorts. Investment banking and financial services also make up an important part of the economy.

Notable firms 
This list includes notable companies with primary headquarters located in the country. The industry and sector follow the Industry Classification Benchmark taxonomy. Organizations which have ceased operations are included and noted as defunct.

References 

Antigua and Barbuda

Antigua and Barbuda
Companies